The Order of the Nation is an honour that can be given by the government of the Bahamas. It was founded in 2016.

Members of the order are styled "The Most Honourable", and members wear the insignia of the order as a decoration while appending the post-nominal letters ON to their name.

References

Orders, decorations, and medals of the Bahamas
Awards established in 2016
2016 establishments in the Bahamas